Robert Lee Gregor (born February 10, 1957) is an American former professional football player who was a defensive back for the San Diego Chargers of the National Football League (NFL). He played college football for the Washington State Cougars. He was selected by the Chargers in the fourth round of the 1980 NFL draft. Gregor started for San Diego in 1981, 1982 and 1983, but he was sidelined by injuries each year.

References

1957 births
Living people
San Diego Chargers players
Players of American football from Riverside, California
Washington State Cougars football players